Robert Foley was Dean of Worcester from his installation on 31 January 1778 until his death on 8 January 1783.

The brother of the first Baron Foley, he was educated at Trinity College, Cambridge. He was ordained in 1745; and held incumbencies at Newent and Kingham. During his years as Dean  he also held the  Mastership of St Oswald's Hospital.

References

Alumni of Trinity College, Cambridge
1783 deaths
Deans of Worcester
Year of birth unknown